Futsal Club Feniks or short FC Feniks are the most successful Kosovan futsal club. They have won 6 championships in the Futsal Superleague of Kosovo

FC Feniks have also participated in UEFA Futsal Cup for the very first time since Kosovo, was admitted by UEFA as a new member in March 2016.

FC Feniks Drenas in the UEFA Futsal Champions League 

FC Feniks wrote also history in the UEFA Futsal Cup by reaching the Elite Rounds (round of 16) as the first Futsal Club in Kosovo to do so in 2016-17

Feniks Drenas in Europe

FC Feniks Drenas wrote history by reaching the Elite Round and competed with the 16 best European Futsal Clubs in this Tournament. 

The results from the first Round of the UEFA Futsal Champions League until the Elite Round off the UEFA Futsal Champions League off the season 2016-17

First round

Main round

Players and coaches 

Head coach :  Arben Simitqiu

Squad season 2016/17 at UEFA official site, .

Domestic achievements 

Futsal Superleague of Kosovo
Champions (7): 
(2003–04, 2005–06, 2007–08, 2008–09, 2009–10, 2015–16, 2017-2018 )
Kosovo Futsal Cup
Winners (6): (2010-11, 2011-12,2013-14,2014-15,2015-16,2017-18)
Kosovo futsal supercup
Winners(3): (2008-09,2010-11,2013-14)

References

Sports teams in Kosovo
Futsal clubs established in 2003